Yury Valavik (born 19 June 1993) is a Belarusian professional football player currently playing for Maxline.

External links

1993 births
Living people
Belarusian footballers
Association football midfielders
FC Dinamo Minsk players
FC Bereza-2010 players
FC Gorodeya players
FC Belshina Bobruisk players
FC Dnepr Rogachev players